is a former Japanese football player.

Playing career
Azuma was born in Kyoto Prefecture on July 10, 1966. After graduating from Doshisha University, he joined Japan Soccer League club Matsushita Electric (later Gamba Osaka) in 1989. Although he played many matches as defender, his opportunity to play decreased in 1993. In 1994, he moved to Yokohama Flügels. Although he played in 2 seasons, he could not play many matches. In 1996, he moved to Japan Football League club Vissel Kobe. The club won the 2nd place in 1996 and was promoted to J1 League. However he could not play at all in the match in 1997 and retired end of 1997 season.

Club statistics

References

External links

f-sports.com

1966 births
Living people
Doshisha University alumni
Association football people from Kyoto Prefecture
Japanese footballers
J1 League players
Japan Football League (1992–1998) players
Gamba Osaka players
Yokohama Flügels players
Vissel Kobe players
Association football defenders